Kenodactylus audouini is a species of beetle in the family Carabidae, the only species in the genus Kenodactylus.

References

Trechinae